Land drainage may refer to:

 Surface drainage of the land
 Drainage system (geomorphology), pattern of natural drains, streams, rivers, etc.
Land drainage -  a legal and operational term in the UK to define a range of functions and responsibilities of drainage boards.
 Surface runoff, surface runoff of excess rainfall from the land
 Drainage system (agriculture), land forming or land shaping to enhance the drainage from the soil surface in agricultural land
 Contour plowing, controlling runoff and soil erosion
 Subsurface (groundwater) drainage
 Horizontal drainage by pipes and ditches
 Drainage
 Tile drainage
 Watertable control
 Vertical drainage by wells
 Well drainage
 Watertable control

Hydrology
Land management